"Soul Survivor" is the second single of American rapper Young Jeezy, and appears on the 2005 album Let's Get It: Thug Motivation 101. The song features Akon. The song was released through Def Jam Recordings and Young Jeezy's Corporate Thugz Entertainment

This song is featured on Def Jam: Icon, a video game for the Xbox 360 & PS3, a video game Young Jeezy appears in as himself providing his own voice and likeness and is a playable character. It was also featured on the Bones episode "The Man in the Wall".

Music video
A music video was produced to promote the single. The video was directed by Benny Boom and is heavily inspired by Paid in Full. Beanie Sigel, Cam'ron, Fabolous, DJ Clue, Zab Judah and Big Meech all make cameo appearances.

Remixes
There are remixes of the song, one features Boyz In Da Hood and Jim Jones, another used the lyrics from Vybz Kartel's "Gun Session" featuring Shabba Ranks, Sizzla, and Akon, a remix features lyrics from Tupac Shakur's "This Life I Lead" and Akon, a remix that features Cam'ron and T.I., and a remix that features Lil Wayne, Mack Maine, Sizzla, 40 Glocc and Boyz In Da Hood. Then another remix which features Cosculluela on his mixtape Antes Del Prrum.

Charts

Weekly charts

Year-end charts

Certifications

References

2005 singles
Jeezy songs
Akon songs
Songs written by Akon
Song recordings produced by Akon
Songs written by Jeezy
2005 songs
Songs written by DJ Toomp